

A 

To find entries for A, use the table of contents above.

B 

 Baardseth – Egil Baardseth (1912–1991)
 Baas – Pieter Baas (born 1944)
 Baas-Beck. – Lourens Gerhard Marinus Baas-Becking (1894–1963)
 Bab. – Charles Cardale Babington (1808–1895)
 Babc. – Ernest Brown Babcock (1877–1954)
 B.A.Bohm – Bruce A. Bohm (fl. 1985)
 Babu – Cherukuri Raghavendra Babu (born 1940)
 Bach – Michael Bach (1808–1878)
 Bachm. – Franz Ewald Theodor Bachmann (1850–1937)
 Bacig. – Rimo Carlo Felice Bacigalupi (1901–1996)
 Bacigalupo – Nélida María Bacigalupo (1924–2019)
 Bäck – Abraham Bäck (1713–1795)
 Backeb. – Curt Backeberg (1894–1966)
 Backer – Cornelis Andries Backer (1874–1963)
 Backh. – James Backhouse (1794–1869)
 Backh.f. – James Backhouse (1825–1890)
 Badham – Charles David Badham (1805–1857)
 Badré – Frederic Jean Badré (born 1937)
 Baehni – Charles Baehni (1906–1964)
 B.A.Ford – Bruce A. Ford (fl. 1998)
 Bagl. – Francesco Baglietto (1826–1916)
 Bagn. – James Eustace Bagnall (1830–1918)
 B.A.Gomes – Bernardino António Gomes (1806–1877)
 Bahadur – Kunwar Naresh Bahadur (1935–1984)
 Bailey – Jacob Whitman Bailey (1811–1857)
 Baill. – Henri Ernest Baillon (1827–1895)
 Baillon – Louis Antoine François Baillon (1778–1851)
 Baines – Henry Baines (1793–1878)
 Baker – John Gilbert Baker (1834–1920)
 Baker f. – Edmund Gilbert Baker (1864–1949)
 Bakh. – Reinier Cornelis Bakhuizen van den Brink (1881–1945)
 Bakh.f. – Reinier Cornelis Bakhuizen van den Brink (1911–1987)
 Balamuth – William Balamuth (1914–1981)
 Balandin – Sergey Aleksandrovich Balandin (born 1952)
 Balansa – Benedict Balansa (1825–1891)
 Balb. – Giovanni Battista Balbis (1765–1831)
 Bald. – Antonio Baldacci (1867–1950) 
 Baldinger – Ernst Gottfried Baldinger (1738–1804)
 Baldwin – William Baldwin (1779–1819)
 Balete – Danilo S. Balete (born 1960)
 B.A.Lewis – Beverley Ann Lewis (born 1966)
 Balf. – John Hutton Balfour (1808–1884)
 Balf.f. – Isaac Bayley Balfour (1853–1922)
 Balick – Michael Jeffrey Balick (born 1952)
 Ball – John Ball (1818–1889)
 Balls – Edward Kent Balls (1892–1984)
 Bals.-Criv. – Giuseppe Gabriel Balsamo-Crivelli (1800–1874)
 Bal.-Tul. – Emilie Balátová-Tuláčková (1926–2005)
 Balzer – F. Balzer (fl. 1912)
 B.-A.Martin – Bernardin-Antoine Martin (1813–1897)
 Bân – Nguyên Tiên Bân (fl. 1973)
 Bancr. – Edward Nathaniel Bancroft (1772–1842)
 Bandara – A. R. Bandara (fl. 2015)
 Banfi – Enrico Augusto Banfi (born 1948)
 Banister – John Banister (1654–1692)
 Banks – Joseph Banks (1743–1820)
 Barb.-Boiss. – Caroline Barbey-Boissier (1847–1918)
 Barbey – William Barbey (1842–1914)
 Barbhuiya – Hussain Ahmed Barbhuiya (born 1985)
 Barbosa – Luis Augusto Grandvaux Barbosa (1914–1983) (The spelling "Agosto" in some sources is incorrect.)
 Barb.Rodr. – João Barbosa Rodrigues (1842–1909)
 Barcelona – Julie F. Barcelona (fl. 1999)
 Bard.-Vauc. –  (born 1948)
 Barger – T. Wayne Barger (fl. 2016)
 Bargh. – Elso Sterrenberg Barghoorn (1915–1984)
 Barham – Henry Barham (c. 1670–1726)
 Barker – George Barker (1776–1845)
 Barkworth – Mary Elizabeth Barkworth (born 1941)
 Barlow – Bryan Alwyn Barlow (born 1933)
 Barneby – Rupert Charles Barneby (1911–2000)
 Barnes – Charles Reid Barnes (1858–1910)
 Barnett – Euphemia Cowan Barnett (1890–1970)
 Barnhart – John Hendley Barnhart (1871–1949)
 Baron – P. Alexis Baron (born 1754)
 Barr – Peter Barr (1826–1909)
 Barrande – Joachim Barrande (1799–1883)
 Barratt –  (1796–1882)
 Barrel. –  (1606–1673)
 Barroso –  (1900–1949)
 Barrow – Sir John Barrow, 1st Baronet (1764–1848)
 Bartal. – Biagio Bartalini (1746–1822)
 Bartel – Jim A. Bartel (fl. 1983)
 Bartell. – Veturia Bartelletti
 Barth – József Barth (1833–1915)
 Barthlott – Wilhelm Barthlott (born 1946)
 Barthol. – Elam Bartholomew (1852–1934)
 Barthol.-Began – Sharon Elaine Bartholomew-Began (born 1958)
 Bartl. – Friedrich Gottlieb Bartling (1798–1875)
 Bartlett – Harley Harris Bartlett (1886–1960)
 Bartley – Floyd Bartley (1888–1974)
 Bartoli – Antonella Bartoli (born 1943)
 Bartolo – Giuseppina Bartolo (born 1948)
 Barton – Benjamin Smith Barton (1766–1815)
 Bartram – John Bartram (1699–1777)
 Bartsch – Johann Bartsch (1709–1738)
 Barulina – Elena Ivanovna Barulina (1896–1957)
 Bas – Cornelis (Kees) Bas (1928–2013)
 Basiner – Theodor Friedrich Julius Basiner (1816–1862)
 Bässler – Manfred Bässler (born 1935)
 Bastard – Toussaint Bastard (1784–1846)
 Bastian – Henry Charlton Bastian (1837–1915)
 Bastow – Richard Austin Bastow (1839–1920)
 Batalin – Alexander Theodorowicz Batalin (1847–1896)
 Bateman – James Bateman (1811–1897)
 Bates – John Mallory Bates (1846–1930)
 Batsch – August Johann Georg Karl Batsch (1761–1802)
 Batt. – Jules Aimé Battandier (1848–1922)
 Baudet – Jean C. Baudet (born 1944)
 Baum – Hugo Baum (1867–1950)
 Baum.-Bod. – Marcel Gustav Baumann-Bodenheim (1920–1996)
 Baumg. – Johann Christian Gottlob Baumgarten (1765–1843)
 Baxter – William Baxter (1787–1871)
 Bayly – Michael James Bayly (born 1970)
 B.Baumann –  (born 1938)
 B.Bock –  (born 1972) (Benoît Bock)
 B.Boivin –  (1916–1985)
 B.Bremer – Birgitta Bremer (born 1950)
 B.Clément – B. Clément (fl. 2001)
 B.C.Stone – Benjamin Clemens Stone (1933–1994)
 B.D.Greene – Benjamin Daniel Greene (1793–1862)
 B.D.Jacks. – Benjamin Daydon Jackson (1846–1927)
 Beadle – Chauncey Delos Beadle (1856–1950)
 Beal – William James Beal (1833–1924)
 Bean – William Jackson Bean (1863–1947)
 Beard – John Stanley Beard (1916–2011)
 Beardslee – Henry Curtis Beardslee, Jr. (1865–1948) (son of Henry Curtis Beardslee, Sr. (1807–1884, abbrev. H.C.Beardslee))
 Beardsley – Paul M. Beardsley (fl. 2012)
 Beatley – Janice Carson Beatley (1919–1987)
 Beattie – Rolla Kent Beattie (1875–1960)
 Beauverd – Gustave Beauverd (1867–1942)
 Beauverie – Jean Beauverie (1874–1938)
 Beauvis. – Georges Eugène Charles Beauvisage (1852–1925)
 Bebb – Michael Schuck Bebb (1833–1895)
 Becc. – Odoardo Beccari (1843–1920)
 Bechst. – Johann Matthäus Bechstein (1757–1822)
 Beck – Günther Beck von Mannagetta und Lerchenau (1856–1931)
 Becker –  (1769–1833)
 Beckh. – Konrad Beckhaus (1821–1890)
 Bedd. – Richard Henry Beddome (1830–1911)
 Bedevian – Armenag K. Bedevian (fl. 1936)
 Bedn.-Ochyra – Halina Bednarek-Ochyra (fl. 2000)
 Beechey – Frederick William Beechey (1796–1856)
 Beeke – Henry Beeke (1751–1837)
 Beentje – Henk Jaap Beentje (born 1951)
 Beetle – Alan Ackerman Beetle (1913–2003)
 Bég. –  (1875–1940)
 Behr – Hans Hermann Behr (1818–1904)
 Beier – Björn-Axel Beier (born 1965)
 Beilschm. – Carl Traugott Beilschmied (1793–1848)
 Beissn. – Ludwig Beissner (1843–1927)
 Beitel – Joseph M. Beitel (1952–1991)
 Bek. – Andrej Nikolaevich Beketow (1825–1902)
 Bellair – Georges Adolphe Bellair (1860–1939)
 Bellardi –  (1741–1826)
 Bello – Domingo Bello y Espinosa (1817–1884)
 Belosersky – Nikola Belosersky (R.N. Belosersky, Nikolaj Ivanovič Belozerskij) (born 1879)
 Beneke – Everett Smith Beneke (1918–2010)
 Benj. – Ludwig Benjamin (1825–1848)
 Benke – Hermann Conrad Benke (1869–1946)
 Benn. – John Joseph Bennett (1801–1876)
 Benner – Walter Mackinett Benner (1888–1970)
 Bennert – H. Wilfried Bennert (born 1945)
 Bennet – Sigamony Stephen Richard Bennet (1940–2009)
 Bennetts – William James Bennetts (1865–1920)
 Benniamin – Asir Benniamin (born 1976)
 Benny – Gerald Leonard Benny (born 1942)
 Benoist – Raymond Benoist (1881–1970)
 Benth. – George Bentham (1800–1884)
 Bentley – Robert Bentley (1821–1893)
 Bentv. – P. A. J. Bentvelzen (fl. 1962)
 Bentzer – Bengt Bentzer (born 1942)
 B.E.Pfeil – Bernard E. Pfeil (fl. 2000)
 Bequaert – Joseph Charles Bequaert (1886–1982)
 Berazaín – Rosalina Berazaín (born 1947)
 Bercht. – Friedrich von Berchtold (1781–1876)
 Berg – Ernst von Berg (1782–1855)
 Berger –  (1814–1853)
 Bergey – David Hendricks Bergey (1860–1937)
 Berggr. – Sven Berggren (1837–1917)
 Bergmans – Johannes Baptista Bergmans (1892–1980)
 Bergon – Paul Bergon (1863–1912)
 Berjak – Patricia Berjak (1939–2015)
 Berk. – Miles Joseph Berkeley (1803–1889)
 Berkhout – Christine Marie Berkhout (1893–1932)
 Bernardi – Luciano Bernardi (1920–2001)
 Bernh. – Johann Jacob Bernhardi (1774–1850)
 Bernstein – Heinrich Agathon Bernstein (1828–1865)
 Bertero – Carlo Luigi Giuseppe Bertero (1789–1831)
 Berthault – François Berthault (1857–1916)
 Berthel. – Sabin Berthelot (1794–1880)
 Bertol. – Antonio Bertoloni (1775–1869)
 Bertoni  – Moisés (de) Santiago (Mosè Giacomo) Bertoni (1857–1929)
 Besch. – Émile Bescherelle (1828–1903)
 Besser – Wilibald Swibert Joseph Gottlieb von Besser (1784–1842)
 Bessey – Charles Edwin Bessey (1845–1915)
 Best – George Newton Best (1846–1926) 
 Betche – Daniel Ludwig Ernst Betche (1851–1913)
 Betancur – Julio Betancur (born 1960)
 Beurton – Christa Beurton (born 1945)
 Beuzev. – Wilfred Alexander Watt de Beuzeville (1884–1954)
 Bews – John William Bews (1884–1938)
 B.E.Wyk – Ben-Erik van Wyk (born 1956)
 B.E.Young – B.E. Young (fl. 1985)
 Beyr. – Heinrich Karl Beyrich (1796–1834)
 B.F.Dana – Bliss F. Dana (born 1891)
 B.Fedtsch. – Boris Alexjewitsch Fedtschenko (1872–1947)
 B.F.Hansen – Bruce Frederick Hansen (born 1944)
 B.F.Holmgren –  (1872–1946)
 B.Field – Barron Field (1786–1846)
 B.G.Baldwin – Bruce Gregg Baldwin (born 1957)
 B.G.Bell – Bruce Graham Bell (born 1942)
 B.G.Briggs – Barbara Gillian Briggs (born 1934)
 B.Gray – Bruce Gray (born 1939)
 B.G.Schub. – Bernice Giduz Schubert (1913–2000)
 B.H.Allen – Bruce H. Allen (born 1952)
 B.Hansen –  (1932–2005)
 Bhatti – Ghulam Raza Bhatti (born 1959)
 B.H.Buxton – Bertram Henry Buxton (1852–1934)
 B.Heyne – Benjamin Heyne (1770–1819)
 B.H.Long – Bayard Henry Long (1885–c. 1969)
 B.H.Macmill. – Bryony Hope Macmillan (born 1933)
 Bhujel – R.B. Bhujel (fl. 1994)
 B.H.Wilcox –  (fl. 1977–1993)
 B.Hyland – Bernard Patrick Matthew Hyland (born 1937)
 Bianca – Giuseppe Bianca (1801–1883)
 Bianchi – Giovanni Bianchi (fl. 1907)
 Bianco – Pasqua Bianco (born 1927)
 Biasol. – Bartolomeo Biasoletto (1793–1859)
 Bidgood – Gillian Sally Bidgood (1948–2018)
 Bidwill – John Carne Bidwill (1815–1853)
 Biehler – Johann Friedrich Theodor Biehler (born c. 1785)
 Bien. – Theophil Joachim Heinrich Bienert (1833–1873)
 Bierh. – David William Bierhorst (1924–1997)
 Biffin – Edward Sturt Biffin (born 1967)
 Bigelow – Jacob Bigelow (1787–1879)
Billb. – Gustaf Johan Billberg (1772–1844)
 Billot – Paul Constant Billot (1796–1863)
 Binn. – Simon Binnendijk (1821–1883)
 Birdw. – George Christopher Molesworth Birdwood (1832–1917)
 Bisch. – Gottlieb Wilhelm T.G. Bischoff (1797–1854)
 Bischl. – Hélène Bischler (1932–2005)
 Bishop – David Bishop (1788–1849)
 Bisse – Johannes Bisse (1935–1984)
 Bisset – James Bisset (1843–1911)
 Biswas – Kalipada Biswas (1899–1969)
 Bitter – Friedrich August Georg Bitter (1873–1927)
 Bittrich –  (born 1954)
 Biv. – Antonius de Bivoni-Bernardi (1774–1837)
 B.J.Conn – Barry John Conn (born 1948)
 B.J.Jacobsen – Barry J. Jacobsen (born 1947)
 B.J.Keighery – Bronwen Jean Keighery (born 1951)
 B.J.Pollard – Benedict John Pollard (born 1972)
 B.Juss. – Bernard de Jussieu (1699–1777)
 B.J.Wallace – Benjamin John Wallace (born 1947)
 B.K.Simon –  (born 1943)
 B.K.Sinha – Bipin Kumar Sinha (born 1960)
 Black – Allan A. Black (1832–1865)
 Blackall – William Blackall (1876–1941)
 Blackmore – John A.P. Blackmore (born 1960)
 Blackw. – Elizabeth Blackwell (1707–1758)
 Blake –  (1814–1888)
 Blakelock – Ralph Anthony Blakelock (1915–1963)
 Blakely – William Blakely (1875–1941)
 Blakeslee – Albert Francis Blakeslee (1874–1954)
 Blakiston – Thomas Wright Blakiston (1832–1891)
 Blanch. – William Henry Blanchard (1850–1922)
 Blanco – Francisco Manuel Blanco (1778–1845)
 Blandow – Otto Christian Blandow (1778–1810)
 Blasdell – Robert Ferris Blasdell (1929–1996)
 Blatt. – Ethelbert Blatter (1877–1934)
 Blaxell – Donald Frederick Blaxell (born 1934)
 B.L.Burtt – Brian Lawrence Burtt (1913–2008)
 B.L.Clark – Bonnie Lynne Clark (born 1966)
 B.L.L.Linden – B. L. van der Linden (fl. 1959)
 Blochm. – Friedrich Blochmann (1858–1931)
 Błocki – Bronislaw Błocki (1857–1919)
 Bloemb. – Siebe Bloembergen (born 1905)
 Blom – Carl Magnus Blom (1737–1815)
 Blomb. – Olof Gotthard Blomberg (1838–1901)
 Blomgr. – Nils Harald Blomgren (1901–1926)
 Blomq. – Sven Gustaf Krister Gustafson Blomquist (1882–1953)
 Błoński – Franciszek Kzawery Błoński (1867–1910)
 Blossf. – Robert Blossfeld (1882–1945)
 B.L.Rob. – Benjamin Lincoln Robinson (1864–1935)
 B.L.Turner – Billie Lee Turner (1925–2020)
 Bluff –  (1805–1837)
 Blume – Carl Ludwig Blume (1796–1862)
 Blytt – Matthias Numsen Blytt (1789–1862)
 B.M.Allen – Betty Eleanor Gosset Molesworth Allen (1913–2002)
 B.Mathew – Brian Frederick Mathew (born 1936)
 B.M.Barthol. – Bruce Monroe Bartholomew (born 1946)
 B.M.Boom – Brian M. Boom (born 1954)
 B.M.Davis – Bradley Moore Davis (1871–1957)
 B.Meeuse – Bastiaan Jacob Dirk Meeuse (1916–1999)
 B.Mey. – Bernhard Meyer (1767–1836)
 B.Nord. – Rune Bertil Nordenstam (born 1936)
 Boccone – Paolo Silvio Boccone (1633–1704)
 Böcher – Tyge W. Böcher (1909–1983)
 Bocq. – Henri Théophile Bocquillon (1834–1883)
 B.O.Dodge – Bernard Ogilvie Dodge (1872–1960)
 Boeckeler – Johann Otto Boeckeler (1803–1899)
 Boed. – Friedrich Bödeker (1867–1937)
 Boehm. – Georg Rudolf Boehmer (1723–1803)
 Boerh. – Herman Boerhaave (1668–1738)
 Boenn. – Clemens von Bönninghausen (1785–1864)
 Boerl. – Jacob Gijsbert Boerlage (1849–1900)
 Boiss. – Pierre Edmond Boissier (1810–1885)
 Boissev. – Charles Hercules Boissevain (1893–1946)
 Boitard – Pierre Boitard (1787–1859)
 Boiteau – Pierre Boiteau (1911–1980)
 Boivin –  (1808–1852)
 Bojer – Wenceslas Bojer (1795–1856)
 Bol. – Henry Nicholas Bolander (1831–1897)
 Boland – Douglas John Boland (born 1947)
 Bo Li – Bo Li (1929–1998)
 Bold. – Isaäc Boldingh (1879–1938)
 Bolle – Carl Bolle (1821–1909)
 Bolley – Henry Luke Bolley (1865–1956)
 B.Øllg. – Benjamin Øllgaard (born 1943)
 Bolton – James Bolton (1735–1799)
 Bolus – Harry Bolus (1834–1911)
 Bomhard – Miriam Lucile Bomhard (1898–1952) 
 Bonaf. – Matthieu Bonafous (1793–1852)
 Bonap. – Roland Napoléon Bonaparte (1858–1924)
 Bondar – Gregório Bondar (1881–1959)
 Bong. – August Gustav Heinrich von Bongard (1786–1839)
 Bonif. – José M. Bonifacino (fl. 2004)
 Bonnem. – Théophile Bonnemaison (1774–1829)
 Bonnier – Gaston Eugène Marie Bonnier (1853–1922)
 Bonpl. – Aimé Bonpland (1773–1858)
 Boom – Boudewijn Karel Boom (1903–1980)
 Boomsma – Clifford David Boomsma (1915–2004)
 Boos – Joseph Boos (1794–1879)
 Boott – Francis Boott (1792–1863)
 Bor – Norman Loftus Bor (1893–1972)
 Borbás – Vinczé von Borbás (1844–1905)
 Borchs. –  (born 1959)
 Boreau – Alexandre Boreau (1803–1875)
 Børgesen – Fredrik Christian Emil Børgesen (1866–1956)
 Borhidi – Attila Borhidi (born 1932)
 Boriss. – Antonina Georgievna Borissova (1903–1970)
 Borkh. – Moritz (Moriz) Balthasar Borkhausen (1760–1806)
 Börner – Carl Julius Bernhard Börner (1880–1953)
 Bornm. – Joseph Friedrich Nicolaus Bornmüller (1862–1948)
 Borrer – William Borrer (1781–1862)
 Borsch –  (born 1969)
 Borss.Waalk. – Jan van Borssum Waalkes (1922–1985)
 Bory – Jean Baptiste Bory de Saint-Vincent (1778–1846)
 Borza – Alexandru Borza (1887–1971)
 Borzí – Antonino Borzí (1852–1921)
 Bos – Jan Just Bos (1939–2003)
 Bosc – Louis Augustin Guillaume Bosc (1759–1828)
 Bosch – Roelof Benjamin van den Bosch (1810–1862)
 Boss. – Pierre Bosserdet (fl. 1970)
 Bosser – Jean Marie Bosser (1922–2013)
 Bostock – Peter Dundas Bostock (born 1949)
 Botsch. – Victor Petrovič Botschantzev (1910–1990)
 Botschantz. – Zinaida Botschantzeva (1907–1973)
 Botta –  (1942–1994)
 Bouchard – Jean Bouchard (fl. 1951)
 Boucher – Jules Armand Guillaume Boucher de Crèvecœur (1757–1844)
 Boud. – Jean Louis Émile Boudier (1828–1920)
 Boufford – David Edward Boufford (born 1941)
 Boulay – Jean Nicolas Boulay (1837–1905)
 Boulenger – George Albert Boulenger (1858–1937)
 Boulger – George Edward Simmonds Boulger (1853–1922)
 Boulos –  (born 1932)
 Boulter – Michael Charles Boulter (born 1942)
 Bourd. – Thomas Fulton Bourdillon (1849–1930)
 Bourdon – M. Bourdon (fl. 1986)
 Bourdot – Hubert Bourdot (1861–1937)
 Bourdu – Robert Bourdu (fl. 1957)
 Bowden – Wray Merrill Bowden (born 1914)
 Bowles – Edward Augustus Bowles (1865–1954)
 Bowman – John Eddowes Bowman the Elder (1785–1841)
 Brace – Lewis Jones Knight Brace (1852–1938)
 Bracelin – Nina Floy Bracelin (1890–1973) 
 Brach – Anthony Robert Brach (born 1963)
 Brack. – William Dunlop Brackenridge (1810–1893)
 Brade – Alexander Curt Brade (1881–1971)
 Bradley – Richard Bradley (1688–1732)
 Braem –  (born 1944)
 Braggins – John E. Braggins (born 1944)
 Brainerd – Ezra Brainerd (1844–1924)
 Braithw. – Robert Braithwaite (1824–1917)
 Brako – Lois Brako (born 1950)
 Bramwell – David Bramwell (born 1942)
 Brand – August Brand (1863–1930)
 Brandão – Mitzi Brandão (fl. 1990)
 Brandbyge – John Brandbyge (born 1953)
 Brandegee – Townshend Stith Brandegee (1843–1925)
 Brandenburg – David M. Brandenburg (born 1953)
 Brandis – Dietrich Brandis (1824–1907)
 Branner – John Casper Branner (1850–1922)
 B.R.Arrill. – Blanca Renée Arrillaga (1917–2011)
 Brassard – Guy Raymond Brassard (born 1943)
 Bräuchler – Christian Bräuchler (born 1975)
 Brauer – David F. Brauer (fl. 1980)
 Braun –  (1800–1864)
 Braun-Blanq. – Josias Braun-Blanquet (1884–1980) (was Josias Braun until 1915)
 Brause – Guido Georg Wilhelm Brause (1847–1922)
 Bravo – Helia Bravo Hollis (1901–2001)
 B.R.Baum – Bernard René Baum (born 1937)
 Bréb. – Louis Alphonse de Brébisson (1798–1872)
 Breda – Jacob Gijsbert Samuel van Breda (1788–1867)
 Breedlove – Dennis Eugene Breedlove (1939–2012)
 Breen (also Schornh.) – Ruth Olive Schornhurst Breen (1905–1987)
 B.Rees – Bertha Rees (fl. 1912)
 Bref. – Julius Oscar Brefeld (1839–1925)
 Brehm – Joachim Brehm (1789–1860)
 Breistr. – Maurice A. F. Breistroffer (1910–1986)
 Breitw. – Ilse Breitwieser (fl. 1986)
 Bremek. – Cornelis Eliza Bertus Bremekamp (1888–1984)
 Brenan – John Patrick Micklethwait Brenan (1917–1985)
 Brenckle – Jacob Frederic Brenckle (1875–1958)
 Breton – André Breton (fl. 1964)
 Bretschn. – Emil Bretschneider (1833–1901)
 Brett – Robert Lindsay Gordon Brett (1898–1975)
 Brewer – James Alexander Brewer (1818–1886))
 B.Rice – Barry Rice (fl. 2011)
 Brickell — Christopher David Brickell (born 1932)
 Brid. – Samuel Élisée von Bridel (1761–1828)
 Bridson – Diane Mary Bridson (born 1942)
 Brieger –  (1900–1985)
 Bright – John Bright (1872–1952)
 Brign. – Giovanni de Brignoli di Brunnhoff (1774–1857)
 Briq. – John Isaac Briquet (1870–1931)
 Bristow – Henry William Bristow (1817–1889)
 Britten – James Britten (1846–1924)
 Brittinger – Christian Casimir Brittinger (1795–1869)
 Britton – Nathaniel Lord Britton (1859–1934)
 B.R.Keener – Brian Reid Keener (born 1973)
 Bromf. – William Arnold Bromfield (1801–1851)
 Bromhead – Edward Ffrench Bromhead (1789–1855)
 Brongn. – Adolphe-Théodore Brongniart (1801–1876)
 Brooker – Ian Brooker (born 1934)
 Brooks – Cecil Joslin Brooks (1875–1953)
 Broome – Christopher Edmund Broome (1812–1886)
 Brophy – Joe Brophy (fl. 2013)
 Brot. – Félix Avelar Brotero (1744–1828)
 Broth. – Viktor Ferdinand Brotherus (1849–1929)
 Broughton – Arthur Broughton (c. 1758–1796)
 Brouillet – Luc Brouillet (born 1954)
 Brouss. – Pierre Marie Auguste Broussonet (1761–1807)
 Browicz –  (1925–2009)
 Browning – J. Browning (fl. 1994)
 B.R.Paterson – Betsy Rivers Paterson (born 1935) 
 B.R.Ramesh – B. R. Ramesh (fl. 1993)
 Bruch – Philipp Bruch (1781–1847)
 Brücher – Heinz Brücher (1915–1991)
 Brug. – Jean Guillaume Bruguière (1749/1750–1798)
 Brügger – Christian Georg Brügger (1833–1899)
 Brugmans – Sebald Justinus Brugmans (1763–1819)
 Bruijn – Ary Johannes De Bruijn (1811–1896)
 Brullo – Salvatore Brullo (born 1947)
 Brummitt – Richard Kenneth Brummitt (1937–2013)
 Brumpt – Émile Josef Alexander Brumpt (1877–1951)
 Brunch. – Jørgen Brunchorst (or Jörgen Brunchorst)  (1862–1917)
 Brunet – Louis-Ovide Brunet (1826–1876)
 Brunfels – Otto Brunfels (1488–1534)
 Brunner – Carl Brunner von Wattenwyl (1823–1914)
 Brunnth. – Josef Brunnthaler (1871–1914)
 Brunsfeld – Steven John Brunsfeld (1953–2006)
 Bruyl. – Julia Bruylants (1890–1974)
 Bruyns –  (born 1957)
 Bryhn – Niels Bryhn (1854–1916)
 B.Schenk – Bernhard Schenk (1833–1893)
 B.Schmid – B. Schmid (fl. 1983)
 B.S.Williams – Benjamin Samuel Williams (1824–1890)
 Bubák – František Bubák (1865–1925)
 Bubani –  (1806–1888)
 Buchanan – John Buchanan (1819–1898)
 Buchenau – Franz Georg Philipp Buchenau (1831–1906)
 Buch.-Ham. – Francis Buchanan-Hamilton (1762–1829)
 Buc'hoz – Pierre Joseph Buc'hoz (1731–1807)
 Buckland – William Buckland (1784–1856)
 Buckley – Samuel Botsford Buckley (1809–1884)
 Buddle – Adam Buddle (1662–1715)
 Buhse – Friedrich Alexander Buhse (1821–1898)
 Bui – Ngoc-Sanh Bui (fl. 1964)
 Buining – Albert Frederik Hendrik Buining (1901–1976)
 Buirchell – Bevan Buirchell (born 1951)
 Bull. – Jean Baptiste François Pierre Bulliard (1742–1793)
 Buller – Arthur Henry Reginald Buller (1879–1944)
 Bullock –  (1906–1980)
 Bunbury – Charles James Fox Bunbury, 8th Baronet (1809–1886)
 Bunge – Alexander Andrejewitsch von Bunge (1803–1890)
 Burb. – Frederick William Burbidge (1847–1905)
 Burbank – Luther Burbank (1849–1926)
 Burch. – William John Burchell (1781–1863)
 Burck – William Burck (1848–1910)
 Burdet –  (born 1939)
 Bureau – Louis Édouard Bureau (1830–1918)
 Burges – Norman Alan Burges (1911–2002)
 Burgess – Henry W. Burgess (fl. 1827–1833)
 Burgman – Mark A. Burgman (born 1956)
 Burkill – Isaac Henry Burkill (1870–1965)
 Burl. – Gertrude Simmons Burlingham (1872–1952)
 Burle-Marx – Roberto Burle Marx (1909–1994)
 Burm. – Johannes Burman (1707–1779)
 Burm.f. – Nicolaas Laurens Burman (1734–1793)
 Burnat – Émile Burnat (1828–1920)
 Burnett – Gilbert Thomas Burnett (1800–1835)
 Burret – Max Burret (1883–1964)
 Burrill – Thomas Jonathan Burrill (1839–1916)
 Burrows – Elsie May Burrows (1913–1986)
 Burtt – Bernard Dearman Burtt (1902–1938)
 Burtt Davy – Joseph Burtt Davy (1870–1940)
 Bury – Priscilla Susan Bury (1799–1872)
 Buscal. –  (1863–1954)
 Büse – Lodewijk Hendrik Büse (1819–1888)
 Buser – Robert Buser (1857–1931)
 Bush – Benjamin Franklin Bush (1858–1937)
 Busse – Walter Carl Otto Busse (1868–1933)
 Bussmann – Rainer W. Bussmann (born 1967) 
 Büttner – Oscar Alexander Richard Büttner (1858–1927)
 Butzin – Friedhelm Reinhold Butzin (born 1936)
 Buxb. – Franz Buxbaum (1900–1979)
 Buxton – Richard Buxton (1786–1865)
 Buyss. – Robert du Buysson (1861–1946)
 B.Vogel – Benedict Christian Vogel (1745–1825)
 B.Walln. – Bruno Wallnöfer (born 1960)
 B.Whittier – Barbara Whittier
 B.Wood – Bertha Wood (fl. 1910)
 B.W.Phillips – Barry W. Phillips (fl. 2011)
 B.W.van Ee – Benjamin William van Ee (born 1975)
 B.Y.Geng – Bao-Yin Geng (fl. 1985)
 Byng – James W. Byng (fl. 2014)
 Byrne – Margaret Mary Byrne (born 1960)
 Byrnes – Norman Brice Byrnes (1922–1998)
 Bytebier – Benny Bytebier (born 1961)

C–Z 

To find entries for C–Z, use the table of contents above.

 
1

Botanists